Montreux Casino (Casino Barrière de Montreux) is a casino located in Montreux, Switzerland, on the shoreline of Lake Geneva. It has served as the venue for the Montreux Jazz Festival and was rebuilt following a 1971 fire memorialized in the Deep Purple song "Smoke on the Water". It is a property of Groupe Lucien Barrière.

History

Montreux Casino was built in 1881 and had modifications made to it in 1903.  Throughout the twentieth century, the site played host to many great symphony orchestras and well-known conductors. By the late 1960s, jazz, blues and rock artists began to perform there.

In 1967 the Casino became the venue for the Montreux Jazz Festival, which was the brainchild of music promoter Claude Nobs. The festival was held there annually and lasted for three days. The highlights of this era were Keith Jarrett, Jack DeJohnette, Bill Evans, Nina Simone, Jan Garbarek, and Ella Fitzgerald. Originally featuring almost exclusively jazz artists, in the 1970s the festival began broadening its scope, including blues, soul, and rock artists.  Some notable rock acts which performed at Montreux Casino in these years include Led Zeppelin (although they never performed at the festival itself), Black Sabbath, Pink Floyd and Deep Purple.

1971 fire
On December 4, 1971, Montreux Casino burned down during a concert by The Mothers of Invention after a fan had set the venue on fire with a flare gun. A recording of the outbreak and fire announcement can be found on a Frank Zappa Bootleg album titled Swiss Cheese/Fire!

The song "Smoke on the Water" by English rock group Deep Purple, who had planned to record Machine Head at the venue and whom the fire forced to seek an alternate recording location, is about the incident:

The Casino was subsequently rebuilt, and during the interim the Montreux Jazz Festival was held in other auditoriums in Montreux, until it could return to the newly re-opened Casino in 1975. The Festival continued to be hosted there until 1993, when it moved to the larger Montreux Convention Centre located approximately one kilometre from the Casino. From 1995 through 2006, the Festival occupied both the Convention Centre and the Casino. 
Beginning with the 41st Festival in 2007, nightly performances of headliners were again moved mainly to the Convention Centre, although the Casino still hosts the odd one-off show.

References

External links
Casino Barrière de Montreux site

Casinos in Switzerland
Montreux
Buildings and structures in the canton of Vaud
Tourist attractions in the canton of Vaud
Swiss companies established in 1881